You Are So Beautiful (French title: Je vous trouve très beau) is a French comedy film released in 2005 by the Gaumont company. It is written and directed by Isabelle Mergault and includes a cast of Michel Blanc, Medeea Marinescu, Wladimir Yordanoff, Benoît Turjman, Éva Darlan and Elisabeth Commelin.

Plot
Aymé played by Blanc, a recently widowed farmer, is eager to find a new wife to help him run his farm.  Desperate, he seeks the aid of a local matchmaker who suggests that he go to Romania to find a new wife. There he meets Elena, played by Marinescu.

Cast
 Michel Blanc as Aymé Pigrenet
 Medeea Marinescu as Elena
 Wladimir Yordanoff as Roland Blanchot
 Benoît Turjman as Antoine
 Éva Darlan as Madame Marais
 Liliane Rovère as Madame Lochet
 Elisabeth Commelin as Françoise
 Valérie Bonneton as Lawyer Labaume
 Julien Cafaro as Thierry
 Arthur Jugnot as Pierre
 Valentin Traversi as Jean-Paul
 Raphaël Dufour as Nicolas
 Isabelle Mergault as The taxi driver

Release
The film premiered at the "Sarlat Film Festival" on 7 November 2005. It was also screened at the Marrakech International Film Festival on 13 November 2005. On 14 June 2006, the film was projected at the Seattle International Film Festival.

Accolades

References

External links

2000s French-language films
Romanian-language films
2005 romantic comedy films
Best First Feature Film César Award winners
French romantic comedy films
Gaumont Film Company films
2005 films
Films shot in Romania
Films set in Romania
France–Romania relations
2000s French films